Dasyrhamphis umbrinus is a species of horse fly, a fly in the family Tabanidae, native to Europe and near East Asia.

Distribution
This species is present in Europe (Albania, Bosnia and Herzegovina, Bulgaria, Croatia, European Turkey, Greece, Italy, Republic of North Macedonia, Slovenia, Yugoslavia and Romania) and in the Near East.

Description
These 'horse flies' are mostly blackish, with clear showing a distinct dark brown spot close to the middle of the anterior margin and near the base of discal cell. Eyes shows a microscopical pubescence. Frontal calli are well-developed. The 3rd antennal segment is slender and less developed.

References

Tabanidae
Insects described in 1820
Taxa named by Johann Wilhelm Meigen
Diptera of Europe